Tekpınar can refer to:

 Tekpınar, Adıyaman
 Tekpınar, İspir
 Tekpınar, Taşova